Yates County is a county in the U.S. state of New York. As of the 2020 Census, the population was 24,774, making it the third-least populous county in New York. The county seat is Penn Yan. The name is in honor of Joseph C. Yates, who as Governor of New York signed the act establishing the county.

Yates County is included in the Rochester, NY Metropolitan Statistical Area.

History
When counties were established in New York State in 1683, the present Yates County was part of Albany County. This was an enormous county, including the northern part of New York State as well as all of the present State of Vermont and, in theory, extending westward to the Pacific Ocean. This county was reduced in size on July 3, 1766, by the creation of Cumberland County, and again on March 16, 1770, by the creation of Gloucester County, both containing territory now in Vermont.

On March 12, 1772, what was left of Albany County was split into three parts, one remaining under the name Albany County. One of the other pieces, Tryon County, contained the western portion (and thus, since no western boundary was specified, theoretically still extended west to the Pacific). The eastern boundary of Tryon County was approximately five miles west of the present city of Schenectady, and the county included the western part of the Adirondack Mountains and the area west of the West Branch of the Delaware River. The area then designated as Tryon County now includes 37 counties of New York State. The county was named for William Tryon, colonial governor of New York.

In the years prior to 1776, most of the Loyalists in Tryon County fled to Canada. In 1784, following the peace treaty that ended the American Revolutionary War, the name of Tryon County was changed to honor the general, Richard Montgomery, who had captured several places in Canada and died attempting to capture the city of Quebec, replacing the name of the hated British governor.

On January 27, 1789,  of Montgomery County was split off to create Ontario County, including the lands of the present Allegany, Cattaraugus, Chautauqua, Erie, Genesee, Livingston, Monroe, Niagara, Orleans, Steuben, Wyoming, and Yates counties, and part of Schuyler and Wayne counties.

On March 18, 1796,  of Ontario County was partitioned to form Steuben County.

On April 3, 1801, Ontario County exchanged land with Cayuga County, and lost  as a result.

On March 30, 1802, Ontario County lost  of land through the partition of Genesee County, including the present Allegany, Cattaraugus, Chautauqua, Erie, Niagara, Orleans and Wyoming counties and parts of Livingston and Monroe counties.

In 1821, Ontario County was reduced in size by combining portions of Genesee and Ontario counties to create Livingston and Monroe counties.

On January 1, 1826,  of Steuben County was partitioned and added to Yates, which included Starkey, Dundee, and Lakemont, New York.

On April 15, 1828,  was partitioned from Yates, and passed to Seneca and Tompkins counties, mostly in the forest.

On March 17, 1860, Ontario County was authorized to gain land from Yates, but it was never put into effect.

On April 18, 1946, Yates gained  from Schuyler and Seneca counties, which produced the current borders of Yates County.

In 1974 a new Mennonite settlement was started in Yates County. It grew quickly and steadily and with a population of more than 3,000 in 2015 it was almost as large as the Lancaster County, Pennsylvania settlement.

Geography

Yates County is in the western part of New York State, northwest of
Ithaca and southeast of Rochester. It is in the Finger Lakes Region.

Adjacent counties
 Ontario County - northwest
 Seneca County - east
 Schuyler County - south
 Steuben County - southwest

Demographics

As of the census of 2000, there were 24,621 people, 9,029 households, and 6,284 families residing in the county.  The population density was 73 people per square mile (28/km2).  There were 12,064 housing units at an average density of 36 per square mile (14/km2).  The racial makeup of the county was 97.90% White, 0.56% African American, 0.15% Native American, 0.28% Asian, 0.02% Pacific Islander, 0.36% from other races, and 0.74% from two or more races. Hispanic or Latino of any race were 0.93% of the population. 21.3% were of English, 16.5% German, 11.4% Irish, 10.7% American, 5.3% Danish and 5.3% Italian ancestry according to Census 2000.

5.46% of the population over 5 years old, mostly Wenger Old Order Mennonites, report speaking Pennsylvania Dutch, German, or Dutch at home, a further 1.54% speak Spanish.

There were 9,029 households, out of which 31.50% had children under the age of 18 living with them, 56.00% were married couples living together, 9.40% had a female householder with no husband present, and 30.40% were non-families. 24.60% of all households were made up of individuals, and 11.60% had someone living alone who was 65 years of age or older.  The average household size was 2.59 and the average family size was 3.08.

In the county, the population was spread out, with 26.70% under the age of 18, 9.30% from 18 to 24, 24.70% from 25 to 44, 23.90% from 45 to 64, and 15.50% who were 65 years of age or older.  The median age was 38 years. For every 100 females there were 95.30 males.  For every 100 females age 18 and over, there were 91.30 males.

The median income for a household in the county was $34,640, and the median income for a family was $40,681. Males had a median income of $29,671 versus $21,566 for females. The per capita income for the county was $16,781.  About 8.90% of families and 13.10% of the population were below the poverty line, including 20.90% of those under age 18 and 7.10% of those age 65 or over.

2020 Census

Education
Keuka College is in this county.

Transportation

Major highways
  New York State Route 14
  New York State Route 14A
  New York State Route 54
  New York State Route 54A
  New York State Route 245
  New York State Route 364

Airport
Penn Yan Airport (PEO), the principal airport in the county, is on a hill south of Penn Yan.

Communities

† - County Seat

‡ - Not Wholly in this county

Towns

 Barrington
 Benton
 Italy
 Jerusalem
 Middlesex
 Milo
 Potter
 Starkey
 Torrey

Hamlets
 Bellona
 Branchport
 Glenora
 Himrod
 Lakemont
 Rock Stream
 Potter Center, New York
 Middlesex, New York

Politics
Yates County has been a Republican bastion, voting for a Democrat only twice since 1856. Although Mitt Romney won the county by only 3.3% in 2012, Donald Trump had won the county by a decisive 19.8%. In 2020, however, Trump won by a slightly lower margin, of 17.5%.

|}

See also

 List of counties in New York
 National Register of Historic Places listings in Yates County, New York
 The Bluff Point Stoneworks

References

Further reading

External links
  Yates County, New York
  Yates County information
 
  Yates County historical information
  Summary history of Yates County and its towns

 
1823 establishments in New York (state)
Populated places established in 1823